"All I Want" is a song by American R&B group 702 recorded for the group's debut album No Doubt (1996). The song was released as the third single for the album and as a promotional single for the soundtrack to the 1997 film Good Burger on July 29, 1997.

The song peaked at number thirty-five on the Billboard Hot 100 chart.

Background
The song contains a sample of The Jackson 5's "It's Great to Be Here," from their 1971 album Maybe Tomorrow.

Release and reception
The song peaked at thirty-five on the U.S. Billboard 200 and reached the thirty-third spot on the Hot R&B/Hip-Hop singles chart.

Music video
The video was shot from July 14–15, 1997 with Kenan Thompson and Kel Mitchell making cameo appearances as Ed and Dexter Reed from the Good Burger movie as well as clips from the movie being shown.

Track listing
CD
"All I Want" (LP Version) - 3:59
"Get It Together" (Bass Mix Extended) - 7:01(feat. Doug Lazy)
"All I Want" (Bink)

Chart performance

Personnel
Credits adapted from album booklet liner notes.
Instruments (background) – Charles Farrar, Troy Taylor
Production – Charles Farrar, Troy Taylor
Writing – Charles Farrar, Berry Gordy, Alphonso Mizell, Freddie Perren, Deke Richards, Troy Taylor

Notes

1997 singles
702 (group) songs
Songs written by Berry Gordy
Songs written by Deke Richards
Songs written by Freddie Perren
1996 songs
Motown singles
Songs written by Alphonzo Mizell